Golensky is a rural locality (a khutor) in Logovskoye Rural Settlement, Ilovlinsky District, Volgograd Oblast, Russia. The population was 1 as of 2010. There is 1 street.

Geography 
The village is located in steppe, on south of Volga Upland.

References 

Rural localities in Ilovlinsky District